The 1968 Brabantse Pijl was the eighth edition of the Brabantse Pijl cycle race and was held on 14 April 1968. The race started and finished in  Sint-Genesius-Rode. The race was won by Victor Van Schil.

General classification

References

1968
Brabantse Pijl